Ereunias is a monotypic genus of marine ray-finned fish belonging to the family Rhamphocottidae, the grunt sculpins. This species was first formally described in 1901 by the American ichthyologists David Starr Jordan and John Otterbein Snyder from Misaki, Sagami in Japan. Jordan and Snyder proposed the new genus Ereunias for the new species. The genus name is derived from ereunao, meaning "to explore" which may refer how it uses elongated pectoral-fin rays as feelers or “feet” to explore the substrate; suffixed with ias which is used in some Greek names for fishes. The specific name grallator  is "stiltwalker" in Latin and is an allusion to the elongated pectoral fin rays. Along with the genus Marukawichthys this taxon was classified in the family Ereunidae but this was synonymised with the Rhamphocottidae in 2014.

References

Rhamphocottidae
Monotypic fish genera
Fish of Japan
Fish described in 1901
Taxa named by David Starr Jordan